Pteropliini is a tribe of longhorn beetles of the subfamily Lamiinae.

Taxonomy

 Abaraeus Jordan, 1903
 Abryna Newman, 1842
 Acanthetaxalus Breuning, 1961
 Acronia Westwood, 1863
 Agniolophia Breuning, 1938
 Albapomecyna Breuning, 1980
 Alidopsis Breuning, 1954
 Alidus Gahan, 1893
 Anaches Pascoe, 1865
 Anobrium Belon, 1902
 Aprophata Pascoe, 1862
 Ataxia Haldeman, 1847
 Atybe Pascoe, 1864
 Baraeus Thomson, 1858
 Batrachorhina Chevrolat, 1842
 Brachyale Breuning, 1963
 Cairnsia Blackburn, 1895
 Callimetopus Blanchard, 1853
 Catafimbria  Aurivillius, 1922
 Cenodocus J. Thomson, 1864
 Cicatripraonetha Breuning, 1980
 Cobria Pascoe, 1865
 Corrhenes Pascoe, 1865
 Corrhenispia Breuning, 1938
 Corrhenodes Breuning, 1942
 Cristodesisa Breuning, 1959
 Cryptocranium Audinet-Serville, 1835
 Cubilia Jordan, 1897
 Cubilioides Breuning, 1940
 Cyardium Pascoe, 1866
 Cyphoscyla Thomson, 1868
 Dasyerrus Pascoe, 1865
 Daxata Pascoe, 1864
 Demodioides Breuning, 1947
 Depsages Pascoe, 1865
 Desisa Pascoe, 1865
 Desisella Breuning, 1942
 Desisopsis Hüdepohl, 1995
 Diexia Pascoe, 1865
 Dystasia Pascoe, 1864
 Dystasiopsis Breuning & de Jong, 1941
 Eczemotellus Heller, 1924
 Eczemotes Pascoe, 1864
 Eczemothea Schwarzer, 1926
 Egesina Pascoe, 1864
 Emphytoecia
 Emphytoeciosoma Melzer, 1934
 Eosthenias Breuning, 1961
 Epectasis Bates, 1866
 Epopaea Thomson, 1864
 Epopea Thomson, 1864
 Esaete Galileo & Martins, 2002
 Esthlogena Thomson, 1864
 Esthlogenopsis Breuning, 1942
 Etaxalus Pascoe, 1865
 Exarrhenodes Breuning, 1938
 Exarrhenus Pascoe, 1864
 Falsoprosoplus Breuning, 1974
 Falsoterinaea Matsushita, 1938
 Falsozorilispe Breuning, 1943
 Faustabryna Breuning, 1961
 Gibbomesosella Pic, 1932
 Grammoechus J. Thomson, 1864
 Hathliodes Pascoe, 1866
 Hathliolophia Breuning, 1959
 Heterotaxalus Heller, 1926
 Ischioplites Thomson, 1864
 Ischnia Jordan, 1903
 Latabryna Hüdepohl, 1990
 Leptomesosella Breuning, 1939
 Lychrosimorphus Pic, 1925
 Macropraonetha Breuning, 1961
 Marmylaris Pascoe, 1866
 Menyllus Pascoe, 1864
 Mesiphiastus Breuning, 1959
 Mesosella Bates, 1884
 Metagnoma Aurivillius, 1925
 Micropraonetha Breuning, 1939
 Milothris Dejean, 1835
 Mimabryna Breuning, 1938
 Mimacronia Vives, 2009
 Mimaspurgus Breuning, 1957
 Mimatossa Breuning, 1943
 Mimectatosia Breuning, 1959
 Mimiphiastus Breuning, 1978
 Mimischnia Breuning, 1971
 Mimodesisa Breuning & de Jong, 1941
 Mimomenyllus Breuning, 1973
 Mimoniphona Breuning, 1940
 Mimoprosoplus Breuning, 1970
 Mimosaperdopsis Breuning, 1959
 Mimosthenias Breuning, 1938
 Mimotropidema Breuning, 1958
 Mindanaona Özdikmen, 2008
 Mispila Pascoe, 1864
 Mispilodes Breuning, 1938
 Mispilopsis Breuning, 1938
 Moron Pascoe, 1858
 Mussardia Breuning, 1959
 Nipholophia Gressitt, 1951
 Niphona Mulsant, 1839
 Niphonatossa Breuning, 1967
 Niphopterolophia Breuning, 1964
 Niphosoma Breuning, 1943
 Niphotragulus Kolbe, 1894
 Niphovelleda Breuning, 1940
 Notocorrhenes Breuning, 1959
 Ophthalmocydrus Aurivillius, 1925
 Parabryna Hüdepohl, 1995
 Paracoedomea Breuning, 1942
 Paracomeron Heller, 1913
 Paracorrhenes Breuning, 1978
 Paradaxata Breuning, 1938
 Paradesisa Breuning, 1938
 Paradiexia Heller, 1923
 Paralophia Aurivillius, 1924
 Paramenyllus Breuning, 1938
 Paramesosella Breuning, 1940
 Paramispila Breuning, 1959
 Paramispilopsis Breuning, 1947
 Paramoron Aurivillius, 1908
 Paramussardia Breuning, 1965
 Paramussardiana Breuning, 1979
 Paranaches Breuning, 1959
 Paraniphona Breuning, 1970
 Parapeleconus Breuning, 1970
 Paraphemone Gressitt, 1935
 Pararhytiphora Breuning, 1938
 Parastesilea Breuning, 1959
 Parasthenias Breuning, 1938
 Paratybe Téocchi & Sudre, 2003
 Parazosmotes Breuning, 1959
 Parepectasoides Breuning, 1979
 Paretaxalus Breuning, 1938
 Parexarrhenus Breuning, 1938
 Penthea Laporte de Castelanu, 1840
 Pentheopraonetha Breuning, 1960
 Phemonoides Breuning, 1940
 Phemonopsis Breuning, 1948
 Phesates Pascoe, 1865
 Phesatiodes Hüdepohl, 1995
 Piliranova Breuning, 1960
 Platycranium Aurivillius, 1917
 Prosoplus Blanchard, 1853
 Protorhopala Thomson, 1860
 Pseudabryna Schultze, 1916
 Pseudalidus Breuning, 1959
 Pseudaprophata Breuning, 1961
 Pseudelasma Breuning, 1968
 Pseudeuclea Schwarzer, 1931
 Pseudodoliops Breuning, 1947
 Pseudolophia Breuning, 1938
 Pseudomenyllus Breuning, 1970
 Pseudomiccolamia Pic, 1916
 Pseudomoron Breuning, 1965
 Pseudomussardia Breuning, 1974
 Pseudoparmena Breuning, 1956
 Pseudotaxalus Breuning, 1938
 Pterolamia Breuning, 1942
 Pterolophia Newman, 1842
 Pteroplius Lepeletier & Audinet-Serville in Lacordaire, 1830
 Pterotragula Teocchi, 1991
 Rhaphiptera Audinet-Serville, 1835
 Rhaphipteroides Touroult & Tavakilian, 2007
 Rhytiphora Audinet-Serville, 1835
 Scaposodus Breuning, 1961
 Sesiosa Pascoe, 1865
 Similosodus McKeown, 1945
 Sodopsis Breuning, 1961
 Soridopsis Breuning, 1940
 Sotades Pascoe, 1864
 Spinegesina Breuning, 1974
 Spinetaxalus Breuning, 1981
 Spinopraonetha Breuning, 1960
 Spinosodus Breuning & de Jong, 1941
 Squamosaperdopsis Breuning, 1959
 Stesilea Pascoe, 1865
 Sthenias Laporte de Castelnau, 1840
 Sybropis Pascoe, 1885
 Sybropraonetha Breuning, 1960
 Symphyletes Newman, 1842
 Synelasma Pascoe, 1858
 Synixais Aurivillius, 1911
 Thaumasesthes Fairmaire, 1894
 Thita Aurivillius, 1914
 Tigranella Breuning, 1940
 Tricheczemotes Breuning, 1938
 Trichepectasis Breuning, 1940
 Trichohathliodes Breuning, 1959
 Tricholophia Breuning, 1938
 Trichoniphona Breuning, 1968
 Trichopenthea Breuning, 1959
 Trichoprosoplus Breuning, 1961
 Trichopterolophia Breuning, 1960
 Trichovelleda Breuning, 1970
 Tuberculetaxalus Breuning, 1980
 Xiphohathlia Breuning, 1961
 Xiphotheata Pascoe, 1864
 Xynenon Pascoe, 1865
 Zaeera Pascoe, 1865
 Zaeeroides Breuning, 1938
 Zaeeropsis Breuning, 1943
 Zosmotes Pascoe, 1865
 Zygrita Thomson, 1860

References

 
Beetle tribes